Astra Unceta y Cía was a Spanish weapons manufacturer founded on July 17, 1908, under the name Esperanza y Unceta by Juan Esperanza and Pedro Unceta.
Initially based in Eibar, the centre of the Basque arms industry, the company moved in 1913 to Guernica.

History
At this stage there was no mention of the sale or manufacture of arms, although both partners had previously been engaged in this field on their own account. In 1908 Juan Esperanza had six full-time staff, and in 1910, ten staff. In 1911 he formed a partnership with Isidro Gaztañaga - Gaztañaga y Esperanza. This new company had between 20 and 30 staff. From 1911 onward patents for firearms began to be issued to P.Unceta y J.Esperanza, concerning improvements to self-loading pistols. In 1913, manufacture of pistols began at their new factory.

Early production
In 1912 a new pistol was adopted by the Spanish military, designed by a retired military officer, Lieutenant-Colonel Don Venancio López de Ceballos y Aguirre, Count of Campo-Giro. The new gun was officially designated the Pistola Campo-Giro de 9mm Modelo 1912, but is generally referred to as the Campo-Giro after its inventor.

After an unknown number of Modelo 1912 pistols had been manufactured, the army became aware that an improved version of the pistol that had been developed by Astra-Unceta, and in January 1914 this model was adopted as the Pistola Campo-Giro de 9mm Modelo 1913. The Model 1913 was manufactured by Esperanza Y Unceta and the increased volume of orders triggered their move to a new factory in Guernica. During 1914 1,300 pistols were made before production was halted to include new modifications.

Modelo 1913
The Modelo 1913 was a delayed blowback design, unusual in a gun chambered for a powerful military cartridge. The Campo-Giro used a powerful spring to handle the recoil of the 9mm Largo cartridge, and had a smaller spring beneath the barrel to serve as a shock absorber and delay the opening of the breach. It retained an external hammer and a top ejection port like the Bergmann–Bayard, but had its magazine in the grip instead in front of the trigger guard, thus allowing a much longer barrel to be fitted. The magazine release lever was just behind the oval-shaped trigger guard between it and the front of the frame. The slide was fixed to the frame by a transverse wedge behind the breech that in turn was held in place by the firing pin. The Campo-Giro was over 225mm (9 inches long), weighed over 900 grams (2 pounds) unloaded, and had an 8-round magazine. It produced a greater muzzle velocity from the 9mm Largo round than did the Bergmann–Bayard, due to its 165mm (6 5/8 inch) longer barrel. The pistol was well made and accurate, but difficult to disassemble.

Campo-Giro patented new improvements in 1913, 1914, and 1915, resulting in a redesigned frame, redesigned mainspring and the magazine release being moved to the bottom of the grip. Because of the First World War, the supply of black buffalo horn that was used for the grips was interrupted and it was substituted for wood. The improved model was adopted in September 1916 as the Pistola Campo-Giro de 9mm, Modelo 1913-16. The company manufactured 13,625 examples  between 1916 and 1919.

First World War
During the First World War the firm supplied the Allies with an estimated 150,000 Ruby-type self-loading pistols. Ironically, the company had first introduced this design in 1911 as the Victoria, a pistol based on the Browning M1903 with improvements patented by Pedro Careaga in 1911, and by the Esperanza y Unceta company in 1912. These patents may have covered the dual-purpose frame-mounted safety (instead of a grip safety), and the method of machining the serrations on the slide using a lathe. The Victoria was in turn copied by Gabilondo y Urresti in 1914, the only real improvement being to increase the magazine capacity to nine cartridges and fit a military style lanyard ring. In 1915 Gabilondo sent examples of the pistols to the French government, and after testing was completed in May of 1915, the French decided to accept the Ruby as the Pistolet Automatique, Type Ruby. Substantial contracts were awarded to Gabilondo and eight partner companies, and eventually desperation led to over 40 Spanish arms makers, including Esperanza y Unceta receiving contracts totaling at least 710,000 and perhaps as high as 950,000 pistols. Esperanza y Unceta  marked their Ruby-types Model 1914, Model 1915, Model 1916, Astra, Brunswig, and Victoria. They were also stamped with the French military identification mark EU on the frame and on the base of the magazine.

Interwar period
The Spanish Army, faced with growing complaints that the Campo Giro was proving to be less durable than expected and that disassembly was too difficult, began to search for a new service weapon. Esperanza y Unceta submitted their newly designed Model 400, and Star their Model A. The Model 400 was designed by Pedro Careaga. Trials took place in 1920 and 1921 and included an 800-round endurance test and harsh condition testing. Under- and over-loaded ammunition was also used, and the pistols measured for wear after 1000-rounds had been fired. In September 1921, the Astra 400 was adopted as the Pistola de 9mm Modelo 1921.  Both models had a long career and stayed into production until 1967 and 1946, respectively.

Two versions were envisaged: The 400 intended for the army as well as the carabineros or frontier troops and the Model 300, a slightly smaller version, intended for naval and air force officers. The Model 300 would be emblematic of the firm.

Astra Modelo 400

The 400 was chambered for the 9mm Bergman-Bayard cartridge, named after the first semi-automatic pistol in use with the Spanish Army. The caliber is known in Spain as the 9mm Largo. During the Spanish Civil War, it was found it chambered the 9mm Parabellum cartridges supplied by Germany.

Offered in .32 ACP, 9mm Parabellum, or .380 ACP, 153,085 units were produced; 63,000 of these in .380 ACP, delivered to Germany, and 22,390 in .32 ACP.

Astra Modelo 200
The Astra 200, a clone of the FN Model 1906, was extensively developed with several versions and calibers, .25 ACP and .22 Short primarily. A total of 234,105 were built. Manufacture ceased in 1967, mainly taking into account new customs rules in the United States.

Name change and reorganization
In 1926 Juan Esperanza left the consortium and created his own company. The company changed name and became Unceta y Compania.

The following year, the Spanish Army launched a new program aiming at modernizing its armaments and Unceta, once again, won the contract.

In 1927, began the series production of Mod.900 largely inspired by famous Mauser C96 and intended for the Nationalist Chinese. Some of these models (Mod.903) were found in the hands of German soldiers during the Second World War while the model F equipped the Guardia Civil.

Although the series production of this model ceased in 1937, small quantities continued to be assembled later from remaining stocks.

Model 400/1921 and variants 
The Astra mod.400, or Model 1921, was a weapon of legend. In France, the Model 400 was nicknamed “mange-tout” (eats everything) because its principal characteristic was to allow ammunition as varied as 9mm Largo (the original caliber), 9x23mm Steyr, 9x19 mm Parabellum, 9mm Glisenti, 9x20mm Browning Long, .38 ACP, and .380 ACP (also known as 9mm Short, 9mm Corto, or 9mm Kurz).

The success of this weapon was such that it was produced until 1941. The weapon was exported to Chile, Germany, Colombia, Ecuador and France. 106,175 units were manufactured, the majority in 9mm Largo. One also notes the production of parts in the following calibers: 7.63 Mauser, 7.65mm Parabellum/.30 Luger as well as 9mm Parabellum.

Production of M 400, model 1921/Spanish:
 Second Spanish Republic, approximately 35,000 units
 Guardia Civil, approximately 10,300 units
 Customs agents, approximately 1,400 units
 Guardia de Asalto, 227 units
 Republic Spanish Navy, 1,650 units
 Chilean Marines, 842 units exported
 Basque Government, 14,800 units
 Fuerzas sublevadas, 825 units (unknown destination)
 Nationalist faction, 27,125 units
 Wehrmacht, 6,000 units exported

During the Civil War, the employees of Astra aligned with the Republicans while the owner, Mr. Unceta, annoyed with some of the new authorities of the 1936 Basque government, left the company, and sided with the Nationalists.

In April 1937, the town of Guernica was bombed by the aircraft of the Condor Legion. Nationalist troops seized the city a few days later and the company's production, redirected by Unceta, increased to supply the troops of Franco and the armies of the Third Reich.

With this completely unforeseen situation, the Republican camp decided on the creation of two military arsenals. The first was established in the suburbs of Barcelona. It produced the M 400 model 1921 called “el puro”, which was renamed F.ASCASO in the honor of a famous anarchistic leader, friend of Buenaventura Durruti,  killed in the first battle of Barcelona. The weapon manufactured in this new republican arsenal, whose workmen were in their immense majority of the anarchist-trade unionists of powerful federation CNT, was of an about equal quality and a precision identical to that of its counterpart of the Basque Country in spite of particular dimensions, and difficulties of obvious provisioning and organization. The total production was approximately 8,000 parts. Machine pistols were also produced in this factory; they are easily identifiable by the three letters CNT engraved on the side of the cylinder head.

Another copy of the M 400 was carried out by another arsenal in the area of Valencia. It is recognizable by the presence of logo R.E. (Spanish Republic) on the plates of the gun. 15,000 units were produced in this firm throughout conflict. No marking of a bench test is present on all these copies. The finish is different compared to the original because of the great diversity of surface treatments, each arsenal using its own formula. Another less known copy of Astra M400 named ORPHAN exists. It was manufactured in the 1930s when ASTRA exported and manufactured on the Asian continent, its exact origin to date remains obscure and unknown.

F.ASCASO TARRASA 9 LARGO: Safety is on the left side of the weapon, and is made of plastic. Grips are black, marked with a circle name F.ASCASO.
Cylinder head steel the logo in a circle marked F.ASCASO, TARRASA, CATALUNA.

ASTRA model 300: A smaller variant of the M.400, designated Model 300, was intended for naval and air officers. It was chambered for .32 ACP and .380 ACP.

Second World War and beyond

Whereas the government, resulting from the civil war, carried out the closing of many arms factories, Unceta y Compañia, in company of rare firms such Star Bonifacio Echeverria S.A. and Gabilondo y Compañia were authorized to continue their activities. During the Second World War, in spite of the official neutrality of Spain, the firm took part in the German war effort by the means of the Astra 600. According to the schedule of conditions of the German Army, it was to be chambered only for 9mm Parabellum, manufacture began in 1943, and 10,450 copies of the 600 were delivered in May and June 1944. The deliveries ceased because of the military situation in France. The contract would be honored well later in 1950 and 1951. The German Federal Republic, to equip its police officers, requested the Allies to allow delivery of the balance of the weapons purchased in 1944. In 1950, a first delivery of 3.500 units took place, followed, in 1951, of the balance of the contract initiated during the conflict and correspondent with 31,350 more 600s delivered.

The other nations which imported the Astra 600 are:
 Portugal, 800 specimens;
 Chile, 450 specimens;
 Jordan, 200 specimens;
 Turkey, 200 specimens;
 The Philippines, Costa Rica, and Egypt also ordered small quantities.

The Astra 600/43, as is true with the vast majority of handgun designs, continues to be carried to a very limited degree by civilians. Many were imported into the United States and sold to the public, where they still see some use. The design is generally considered ugly and antiquated in its appearance and its method of disassembly and re-assembly for cleaning is often intimidating. Despite this, the weapon is designed well in terms of safety, durability, reliability, accuracy and (surprisingly to many due to its awkward appearance), ergonomics. The cartridge it fires is reasonably powerful and widely available globally, and as is the case with many early 20th century guns, production costs to manufacture faithful new copies of the design would be prohibitively expensive due to machine time and the use of large amounts of expensive steel.

In 1946 the firm reorganized and diversified its activities, beginning its production of industrial equipment without giving up firearms manufacturing. New products consisted mainly in tires, hydraulic pumps and machine tools for the textile industry. For the weapons production, it obtained new machines and started research projects in order to renew its range. The Astra Model 3000 was the result of one of them and its production begins the following year.

In 1947, the model Astra Model 3000 was put in production in order to replace them Astra Model 300. More than 44,000 Astra 3000 were manufactured until 1956, when the Astra Model 4000 Falcon replaced it. In 1953 the firm adopted its final name of Astra y Unceta Cia, S.A.

New models were released over the years: Astra Model 800 Condor in 1958, Astra A-70, Astra A-80, Astra A-90, Astra-100 in the eighties. The firm also produced revolvers that were replicas of Colt, Ruger or Smith & Wesson. Astra continued the production and the development of many reliable and elegant models which made its reputation among the amateurs of weapons and the pride of Basque arms industry.

Decline and bankruptcy

In 1977, Augusto Unceta-Barrenechea, the last successful manager and owner of Astra, was killed by the ETA separatist group.

In 1998, under the impulse of Basque government, a new company made up of the fusion of Astra Unceta y Cia and the bankrupt Star Bonifacio Echeverria S.A. was created. This new entity, named ASTAR, lived a short life and ceased operations by the end of the same year.

Most buildings were demolished in 2006, excepted for the former headquarters that were saved thanks to community mobilization.

Astra Arms S.A. - Switzerland
In 2008, 100 years after the foundation of Esperanza y Unceta (Astra Unceta y Cía), a Swiss firearms manufacturing company, founded by the Italian entrepreneur Massimo Garbarino and located in the city of Sion, adopted the name Astra Arms S.A. and took over the rights on the Astra trademark. Astra Arms S.A. has established a manufacturing line for high level 1911-type pistols (the U.S. model and the Daytona model), as well as a manufacturing line for AR-15 rifles (the StG-15 and StG-4 models), to be distributed on those civilian markets which at the time were lacking similar American products, whose export requires the issue of an End user certificate. At present, the Astra Arms S.A. products are distributed on the European civilian market and Central and South American, Asian and African military market.

Manufacturing year code
Since 1927 all Spanish weapons are tested on the official test bench of Eibar and are marked or engraved with letters that indicate the year of manufacture.

See also
Arms industry
List of modern armament manufacturers
Llama firearms
Star Firearms

References

External links
 Astra 900 (Spanish Copy) Information
 Astra 900 - Unceta y Cia Information
 Astra S.A. (Switzerland) web site

Firearm manufacturers of Spain
Defunct manufacturing companies of Spain
World War I French infantry weapons
World War I Italian infantry weapons
World War II infantry weapons
Defunct firearms manufacturers
Defence companies of Spain
1908 establishments in Spain